Johar Town (Punjabi/, Shahrak-e-Johar) is a residential neighborhood and union council (UC 114) located in Iqbal Tehsil of Lahore, Punjab, Pakistan. 

Johar Town is named after Mohammad Ali Jouhar, one of several prominent leaders of the Pakistan Movement.

Subdivisions

Attractions

Lahore Expo Centre
Emporium Mall

Education and Health
There are lot of educational institutes and medical centers in johar town.
University of Central Punjab
University of Management & Technology
Punjab Group of Colleges
Bahria University, Lahore Campus
Lahore Grammar School, 4 Branches
Bloomfield Hall School
Musab School System
Shaukat Khanum Memorial Cancer Hospital & Research Centre
Bait-Ul-Ilm School
International School of Choueifat
Lahore College of Arts and Sciences
School of International Studies in Sciences and Arts
Latif Hospital
Horizon Hospital
Doctors Hospital
 Mughal Eye Hospital 
Pakistan Institute of Fashion and Design
Beaconhouse School System, Johar Town (3 Branches)

See also 

 2021 Lahore bombing, in Johar Town

References

Populated places in Lahore District
Iqbal Town, Lahore